A Microsoft account or MSA (previously known as Microsoft Passport, .NET Passport, and Windows Live ID) is a single sign-on Microsoft user account for Microsoft customers to log in to Microsoft services (like Outlook.com), devices running on one of Microsoft's current operating systems (e.g. Microsoft Windows computers and tablets, Windows Phones, and Xbox consoles), and Microsoft application software (including Visual Studio).

History
Microsoft Passport, the predecessor to Windows Live ID, was originally positioned as a single sign-on service for all web commerce.  Microsoft Passport received much criticism.  A prominent critic was Kim Cameron, the author of The Laws of Identity, who questioned Microsoft Passport in its violations of those laws. He then joined Microsoft in 1999 after his company was acquired and was its Chief Architect of Access and Identity until his 2019 retirement, helping to address those violations in the design of the Windows Live ID identity meta-system.  As a consequence, Windows Live ID is not positioned as the single sign-on service for all web commerce, but as one choice of many among identity systems.

In December 1999, Microsoft neglected to pay their annual $35 "passport.com" domain registration fee to Network Solutions. The oversight made Hotmail, which used the site for authentication, unavailable on December 24. A Linux consultant, Michael Chaney, paid it the next day (Christmas), hoping it would solve this issue with the downed site. The payment resulted in the site being available the next morning. In Autumn 2003, a similar good Samaritan helped Microsoft when they missed payment on the "hotmail.co.uk" address, although no downtime resulted.

In 2001, the Electronic Frontier Foundation's staff attorney Deborah Pierce criticized Microsoft Passport as a potential threat to privacy after it was revealed that Microsoft would have full access to and usage of customer information. The privacy terms were quickly updated by Microsoft to allay customers' fears.

In July and August 2001, the Electronic Privacy Information Center and a coalition of fourteen leading consumer groups filed complaints with the Federal Trade Commission (FTC) alleging that the Microsoft Passport system violated Section 5 of the Federal Trade Commission Act (FTCA), which prohibits unfair or deceptive practices in trade.

Microsoft had pushed for non-Microsoft entities to create an Internet-wide unified-login system. Examples of sites that used Microsoft Passport were eBay and Monster.com, but in 2004 those agreements were cancelled. In August 2009, Expedia sent notice out stating they no longer support Microsoft Passport / Windows Live ID.

In 2012, Windows Live ID was renamed Microsoft account.

Overview
Microsoft account allows users to sign into websites that support this service using a single set of credentials. Users' credentials are not checked by Microsoft account-enabled websites, but by a Microsoft account authentication server. A new user signing into a Microsoft account-enabled website is first redirected to the nearest authentication server, which asks for username and password over an SSL connection. The user may select to have their computer remember their login: a newly signed-in user has an encrypted time-limited cookie stored on their computer and receives a triple DES encrypted ID-tag that previously has been agreed upon between the authentication server and the Microsoft account-enabled website. This ID-tag is then sent to the website, upon which the website plants another encrypted HTTP cookie in the user's computer, also time-limited. As long as these cookies are valid, the user is not required to supply a username and password. If the user actively logs out of their Microsoft account, these cookies will be removed.

Microsoft account offers a user two different methods for creating an account:
Use an existing e-mail address: Users are able to use their own valid e-mail address to sign up for a Microsoft account. The service turns the requesting user's e-mail address into a Microsoft account. Users may also choose a password of their own choice.
Sign up for a Microsoft e-mail address: Users can also sign up for an e-mail account with Microsoft's webmail services designated domains (i.e. @hotmail.com or @outlook.com that can be used as a Microsoft account to sign into other Microsoft account-enabled websites.
The e-mail domains @live.com, @msn.com and @passport.com are discontinued.

Microsoft websites, services, and apps such as Bing, MSN and Xbox Live use Microsoft account as a mean of identifying users. There are also several other companies that use it, such as the Hoyts website which is hosted by NineMSN.

Windows XP and later has an option to link a Windows user account with a Microsoft account, thus automatically logging users in to their Microsoft account whenever a service is accessed. Starting with Windows Server 2012, Windows allows users to directly authenticate into their PCs using their Microsoft account rather than a local or domain user.

Profile
A feature of the Microsoft account service is the profile manager, named Profile, which was formerly part of Windows Live. It displays information about the particular user, their recent activities, and their relationship with other Windows Live users. It also provides the ability to connect with others through Skype, and via social networks such as Facebook, MySpace and LinkedIn.

Users can share some of their personal information such as interests and hobbies, and social information such as their favorites quote, hometown, or places lived previously. Profile also allows users to modify their privacy settings to decide what is shared.

Web authentication
On August 15, 2007, Microsoft released the Windows Live ID Web Authentication SDK, enabling web developers to integrate Windows Live ID into their websites running on a broad range of web server platforms - including ASP.NET (C#), Java, Perl, PHP, Python and Ruby.

Support for OpenID
On October 27, 2008, Microsoft announced that it was publicly committed to supporting the OpenID framework, with Windows Live ID becoming an OpenID provider. This would allow users to use their Windows Live ID to sign into any website that supports OpenID authentication.  There had been no update on Microsoft's planned implementation of OpenID since August 2009, however since November 2013 Microsoft have publicly participated in OpenID Connect interoperability testing.

Login methods
In addition to using an account password, users can login to their Microsoft account by accepting a mobile notification sent to a mobile device with Microsoft Authenticator, a FIDO2 security token or by using Windows Hello. Users can also set up two-factor authentication by getting a time-based, single-use code by text, phone call or using an authenticator app.

Features

Microsoft account is the website for users to manage their identity. Features of a Microsoft account include:
 updating user's information such as first and last names, address, etc. associated with the account;
 updating user settings, such as preferred language or preferences for email communications;
 changing or resetting user passwords;
 close the account;
 view billing details associated with the accounts.

Integrated with
The following is a list of computer programs and web services that support using Microsoft Account as the credentials required for the authentication process.
Windows 8 and later
Windows Server 2012 and later
 Windows components
Calendar
Cortana
Groove Music
Feedback Hub
Mail
Movies & TV
Microsoft Store
Outlook Express
People
Windows Messenger
Windows Phone 7 and later
Windows Phone Store
Bing
Exchange Online
Exchange Online Protection
Microsoft Office
Office 365
Office Online
OneDrive (formerly SkyDrive)
Outlook.com (formerly Hotmail)
Skype
System Center Advisor
Visual Studio
Microsoft Azure (formerly Windows Azure)
Windows Insider Program
Windows Live Messenger
Windows Movie Maker
Windows Photo Gallery
Xbox network

Security vulnerabilities
On June 17, 2007, Erik Duindam, a web developer in the Netherlands, reported a privacy and identity risk, saying a "critical error was made by Microsoft programmers that allows everyone to create an ID for virtually any e-mail address."  A procedure was found to allow users to register invalid or currently used e-mail addresses. Upon registration with a valid e-mail address, an e-mail verification link was sent to the user. Before using it however, the user was allowed to change the e-mail address to one that did not exist, or to an e-mail address currently used by someone else. The verification link then caused the Windows Live ID system to confirm the account as having a verified email address. That flaw was fixed two days later, on June 19, 2007.

On April 20, 2012, Microsoft fixed a flaw in Hotmail's password reset system that allowed anyone to reset the password of any Hotmail account. The company was notified of the flaw by researchers at Vulnerability Lab on the same day and responded with a fix within hours — but not before widespread attacks as the exploitation technique spread quickly across the Internet.

On December 3, 2015, a security researcher discovered a vulnerability in the Adobe Experience Manager (AEM) software used on signout.live.com and reported it to the Microsoft Security Response Center (MSRC). This vulnerability enabled full-administrative access to the AEM Publish nodes' OSGi console and made it possible to execute code inside of the JVM through the upload of a custom OSGi bundle. The vulnerability was confirmed to have been resolved on May 3, 2016.

See also
 Identity management
 Identity management system
 List of single sign-on implementations
Other identity services
 Active Directory Federation Services
 OpenID
 Light-weight Identity
 Yadis
 Windows CardSpace
Identity management
 Liberty Alliance
 OASIS (organization)
 Windows Hello

References

Further reading
 Creating a Microsoft account
 Introduction to Windows Live ID whitepaper — Provides a brief overview of the Windows Live ID service in the context of Microsoft's overall identity strategy.
 Understanding Windows Live Delegated Authentication whitepaper — Describes how a Web site can use the Windows Live ID Delegated Authentication system to get permission to access users' information on Windows Live services.
 Windows Live ID Federation whitepaper — Describes the concept of identity federation and offers considerable detail about how the Windows Live ID service supports it.

External links

 

ID
Federated identity
Companies' terms of service
Microsoft